Dabangg is a 2010 Indian Hindi-language action comedy film directed by Abhinav Singh Kashyap (in his directorial debut) and produced by Arbaaz Khan (in his debut as a film producer) and Malaika Arora Khan under Arbaaz Khan Productions, with Dhilin Mehta serving as the co-producer and distributor of the film under Shree Ashtavinayak Cine Vision banner. Khan's elder brother Salman Khan starred in the lead role, with Sonakshi Sinha (in her acting debut) as the female lead, Sonu Sood playing the antagonist and himself featuring in a supporting role. Other actors who feature in supporting roles are Om Puri, Dimple Kapadia, Vinod Khanna, Anupam Kher, Mahesh Manjrekar and Mahie Gill. Besides producing the film, Malaika also appears in the item number "Munni Badnaam Hui". Set in the Indian state of Uttar Pradesh, Dabangg tells the story of a fearless police officer, Chulbul Pandey (Khan) and his troubled relationship with his stepfather and half-brother.

Dabangg received accolades in major film award functions in India. Among them, it won the National Film Award for Best Popular Film Providing Wholesome Entertainment. It was given six awards at the 56th Filmfare Awards, including one for Best Film, seven Screen Awards, nine Zee Cine Awards, and ten IIFA Awards. As of 2012, the film has won 111 awards out of 172 nominations.

Awards and nominations

Notes

References

External links
 Awards for Dabangg at Bollywood Hungama

Lists of accolades by Indian film